Arun Sarma (3 November 1931 – 27 March 2017) was a writer of Assam. Arun Sarma was one of Assam's contemporary playwrights and is particularly known for his unconventional plays with some elements of drama. Besides drama, he also authored over six novels detailing the Assamese way of life. He was awarded the Padma Shri in 2010 in recognition of his contributions to Assamese literature. He has also been awarded the Sahitya Akademi Award in 1998 for the novel Ashirbadar Rong (The Hues of Blessing). He has won the Asam Sahitya Sabha's Best Playwright Award for two consecutive years and also has the rare distinction of having won the Sangeet Natak Akademi award in 2003 for his contributions to drama and the Sahitya Akademi award in 1998 for literature. He was also the recipient of the Assam Valley Literary Award in 2005.

Early life
Arun Sarma was born in Dibrugarh where his father Tilak Chandra Sarma was the editor of The Times of Assam. In 1935, the family migrated to the village of Halemguri near the tea hamlet of Halem, where the elder Sarma, inspired by Gandhian ideals, decided to take up farming and engage himself in social work. The young Arun did his schooling in Tezpur High School and completed his matriculation in 1948. Sarma completed his B.A.(Hons in Education) in 1954 from Cotton College, Guwahati. He began writing drama and poetry during this period.

Career
Sarma started his career in Guwahati in the editorial staff of The Assam Tribune in 1954. In 1955, he moved to his native village in Halem and joined as an Assistant Headmaster in Madhya Chaiduar High School popularly known as MCD High School established in the year 1948  (Now MCD Higher Secondary School) at Barangabari. In 1960, he came back to Guwahati to join All India Radio. From then till 1986, Sarma was associated with the Guwahati Station of All India Radio, working first as a producer and later as a senior producer. He headed the Educational Broadcasting Section, and did pioneering work in using radio as a potent medium for supplementing classroom education. He had a six-month training stint on Radio Programme Production in BBC, London, in 1969. Through the 1970s and 1980s, Sarma was instrumental in shaping the Drama section of the Guwahati Station. During this period he wrote and directed 47 plays and a good number of radio documentaries for the Station as well as for All India Radio's national programme and received three international best awards for his documentaries. He served as Station Director of the Dibrugarh Station of the All India Radio (1986–89) and retired from government service as Director, AIR, North East Service from Shillong in 1990.

Post retirement, he became the founder editor (1990–92) of the weekly Assamese newspaper Purbachal, and served from 1992 to 1997 as the Director of the Tea Centre of the Indian Tea Association. This was a period of strife in Assam and Sarma was called in to design and execute a set of projects to bridge the local tea industry and the Assamese people. In 2005, Sarma designed, scripted and executed a son-et-lumiere (sound-and-light show) describing the history of Assam which is played daily at the Sankardeva Kalakshetra in Guwahati every evening.

Personal life
In 1959, Sarma married Arati, granddaughter of Assamese Freedom Fighter, Karmaveer Chandranath Sarma. They have two children – Nandinee and Ochintya. He died on 27 March 2017 at the Medanta medical institute.

Awards

For literature
  Asam Sahitya Sabha (Drama) Award – 1967
  Asom Natya Sanmilan Award – 2001
  Sahitya Akademi Award – 1998 for the Novel 'Aashirbador Rong' (translated into English titled as 'On a Wing and a Prayer')
  Sangeet Natak Akademi Award – 2003
  Assam Valley Literary Award – 2005
  Padma Shri – 2010
  Sankaracharyya Avatar Award Literature – 2010

For radio broadcasting
  Japan Prize (1980) International for the radio documentary "All Buds to bloom".
  ABU (Asia-Pacific Broadcasting Union) Award (1982) for the radio documentary "Caution : Danger Ahead".
  Prix Futura Berlin Commendation certificate (1983) for the radio documentary "All Lips to Smile".
  Akashvani Award (Second best radio play in India) for the play titled "Kukurnechia Manuh".

Works

Plays

 Urukha Paja (The Leaky Hut): 1954
 Jinti: 1955
 Sthawor: 1956
 Sri Nibaran Bhattacharyya: 1964
 Parashuram: 1962
 Purush! (The Man): 1965
 Kukurnechia Manuh (The Wolf Man): 1968
 Ahar (Food): 1970
 Chinyor (The Scream): 1972
 Buranji Path (The History Lesson): 1978
 Padma, Kunti Ityadi (Padma, Kunti, et al.): 1976
 Anya Ek Adhyay (Yet Another Chapter): 1994
 Poster : 1982
 Agnigarh (The Fortress of Fire): 1996
 Napoleon Aru Deserie: 1985
 Baghjaal (The Tiger Trap): 1983
 Chakrabyuha (The Labyrinth): 2003
 Aditir Atma Katha (Aditi's Autobiography): 2000
 Chitralekha: 2006
 Robes of Destiny (A Trilogy in English and some more plays): 2014
 Anupam Andhar (Dark is Beautiful): 2013
 Arun Sarma Nirbachito Natok (Collected Plays of Arun Sarma): 2014

Novels
 Ubhala Shipa (The Root Upturned: Also known as Nixi Ujagor: 1979
 Niriha Ashroy (Innocent Shelter)
 Aashirbador Rong (The Hues of Blessings), translated into English titled as 'On a Wing and a Prayer''': 1996
 Sankalpa (The Pledge): 2008
 Baghjaal (The Tiger Trap - a short novel): 2014
 Nepothyo Chandranath: 2014

Poems

 Arun Sarmar Kabyanurag : 2012

Essays

 Arun Sarmar Natyoproxongo aaru Ononnyo Rosona (Theatre Critiques and other Essays)'' : 2012

References

External links
Arun Sarma, The Pride of Assam
Padma Awards 2010 Press Information Bureau
Centre for Development and Peace Studies 
Assam Tribune profile, May 2009
The Telegraph profile, 5 January 2004 
The Assam Tribune, 26 January 2010

1931 births
2017 deaths
People from Dibrugarh district
Indian male novelists
Recipients of the Padma Shri in literature & education
Novelists from Assam
Assam dramatists and playwrights
Recipients of the Assam Valley Literary Award
Indian male dramatists and playwrights
20th-century Indian novelists
20th-century Indian dramatists and playwrights
Dramatists and playwrights from Assam
20th-century Indian male writers
Recipients of the Sahitya Akademi Award in Assamese
Recipients of the Sangeet Natak Akademi Award